Identity group may refer to:

Identity (social science)
Social group
Trivial group, a mathematical group consisting of a single element.